Brigadier General Arthur Johnson (1862 – February 3, 1946) was a United States Army officer who served during World War I.

Early life and education
Arthur Johnson was born to Swan Johnson and Margaret Elizabeth Nelson Johnson in 1862 on a farm near Swan Lake Minnesota. His birth location is listed as St. Peter, Minnesota on other records. He had one brother, Franklin Oliver Johnson, who also served as an officer.

He entered the United States Military Academy in 1881 and graduated 61st out of a class of 77 in 1886.

Military service
Following graduation from USMA, Johnson commissioned into the infantry and performed frontier duty with the 11th and 17th Infantry Regiments on the frontier in Arizona.

During the Spanish–American War, he commanded the 12th Infantry Regiment, which participated in the siege and surrender of Santiago, Cuba.

Johnson would later serve in the Philippine–American War.

From 1901 to 1908, he held a variety of posts commanding small units within the US and abroad. In 1908 to 1909, he attended the Army Service Schools and later the Army War College. Following that, he was promoted to major on November 1, 1901, and assigned a battalion of the 19th Infantry Regiment in the Philippines. Following his service in the Philippines, he instructed and inspected the Minnesota Militia until September 2, 1913, when he was transferred to Texas. Johnson was moved from Texas to Minnesota and back until he was assigned to the 36th Infantry Division on August 11, 1916.

Johnson took command of the division on May 15, 1917, concurrent with his promotion to a colonel.

World War I
In November 1917, Johnson was sent to Paris as part of the American Expeditionary Forces. He took command of an intermediate section of the Service of Supply. During his command, he received the Army Distinguished Service Medal and the Legion of Honour for efficiently utilizing female labor in Nevers, France. The citation for his Army DSM reads:

On April 12, 1918, he was promoted to brigadier general.

Postwar and retirement
Johnson was reverted to the rank of colonel on March 15, 1920. He retired on July 9th, 1925. An act of Congress restored his wartime rank of brigadier general in June 1930.

Following his retirement, he lived with his family in Wilmette, Illinois where he died on February 3, 1946, at the age of 84.

References

External links
 valor.militarytimes.com
 findagrave

1862 births
1946 deaths
People from St. Peter, Minnesota
Military personnel from Minnesota
United States Military Academy alumni
Recipients of the Distinguished Service Medal (US Army)
United States Army generals of World War I
American military personnel of the Philippine–American War
Recipients of the Legion of Merit
People of the Spanish–American War
United States Army generals